Donte Kenneth Jackson (born November 8, 1995) is an American football cornerback for the Carolina Panthers of the National Football League (NFL). He played college football at LSU, and was selected in the second round of the 2018 NFL Draft by the Panthers.

Early years
Jackson attended Riverdale High School in Jefferson, Louisiana. He committed to Louisiana State University (LSU) to play college football.

College career
Jackson played at LSU from 2015 to 2017 under head coaches Les Miles and Ed Orgeron. After his junior season in 2017, he decided to forgo his senior year and enter the 2018 NFL Draft. During his career he had 110 tackles, four interceptions and one sack. Jackson was an accomplished sprinter on LSU's track and field team. He has personal bests of 6.63 and 10.22 in the 60 and 100 meters, respectively. He was named the fastest player in college football in 2017.

Professional career
On January 9, 2018, Jackson released a statement on his Twitter account announcing his decision to forgo his remaining eligibility to enter the 2018 NFL Draft. He attended the NFL Scouting Combine in Indianapolis and performed the majority of drills before developing cramps. Jackson's 40-yard dash tied Tulane's Parry Nickerson and Ohio State's Denzel Ward for the best time among all players at the NFL Combine.

On April 4, 2018, Jackson participated at LSU's pro day and performed the 40-yard dash (4.31s), 20-yard dash (2.54s), (1.54s), vertical jump (37"), and broad jump (10'2"). At the conclusion of the pre-draft process, he was projected to be a second round pick by NFL draft experts and scouts. He was ranked as the sixth best cornerback prospect in the draft by DraftScout.com and NFL analyst Mike Mayock.

The Carolina Panthers selected Jackson in the second round with the 55th overall pick in the 2018 NFL Draft. He was the sixth cornerback drafted in 2018.

2018
On May 10, 2018, the Carolina Panthers signed Jackson to a four-year, $4.81 million contract that includes $2.27 million guaranteed and a signing bonus of $1.58 million. In Week 2, against the Atlanta Falcons, he recorded his first career interception. In Week 3, against the Cincinnati Bengals, Jackson recorded two interceptions in the 31–21 victory. He finished the season starting all 16 games, recording 74 combined tackles, a sack, nine pass deflections, and a team-leading four interceptions, which led all rookies.

2019
In Week 3 against the Arizona Cardinals, Jackson intercepted Kyler Murray twice in the 38–20 win.

2020
In Week 2 against the Tampa Bay Buccaneers, Jackson recorded his first interception of the season off a pass thrown by Tom Brady during the 31–17 loss.
In the following week's game against the Los Angeles Chargers, Jackson intercepted a pass thrown by Justin Herbert and returned it for 66 yards during the 21–16 win.

2021
Jackson entered the 2021 season as a starting cornerback alongside rookie Jaycee Horn and veteran A. J. Bouye. He suffered a groin injury in Week 12 and was placed on season-ending injured reserve on November 30, 2021. He finished the season with 61 tackles, a forced fumble, two interceptions, and a team-leading 10 passes defensed through 12 starts.

2022 
On March 19, 2022, Jackson signed a three-year, $35.1 million contract extension with the Panthers. He suffered a torn Achilles in Week 10 and was placed on season-ending injured reserve on November 14, 2022.

Regular season

References

External links
Carolina Panthers bio
LSU Tigers bio
Twitter

1995 births
Living people
People from Metairie, Louisiana
Players of American football from Louisiana
American football cornerbacks
LSU Tigers football players
LSU Tigers track and field athletes
Carolina Panthers players